Wordie Nunatak is a rock outcrop 4 nautical miles (7 km) southeast of Mount Biscoe and 4 nautical miles (7 km) east-northeast of Mount Hurley. Discovered in January 1930 by the British Australian New Zealand Antarctic Research Expedition (BANZARE), 1929–31, under Mawson, and named for James M. Wordie.

Nunataks of Enderby Land